Abernant is a hamlet near Montgomery, Powys and is 75 miles (121 km) from Cardiff and 150 miles (242 km) from London.

The spring forms above Abernant, near the summit of Banc y Celyn (472m), and runs through Abernant to join the River Wye.
There is a large adventure centre, a branch of Manor Adventure, that operates from an old hotel in Abernant.

There is also a mine in the hills outside the village.

See also
List of localities in Wales by population

References

Villages in Powys